Sun Xiaodi has spent more than a decade petitioning the central Chinese authorities over radioactive contamination from the No. 792 Uranium Mine in the Gannan Tibetan Autonomous Prefecture in Gansu Province.  In 2006, he received the prestigious Nuclear-Free Future Award.

See also
List of Nuclear-Free Future Award recipients
Uranium in the environment
Uranium mining debate

References

External links
Chinese anti-nuclear activist sent to labour camp - acfonline.org.au

Chinese environmentalists
Anti-uranium activists
Living people
Year of birth missing (living people)